The inferior deep cervical lymph nodes extend beyond the posterior margin of the sternocleidomastoid muscle into the subclavian triangle, where they are closely related to the brachial plexus and subclavian vein.

References

Lymphatics of the head and neck